Kevin A. Sorenson  (born November 3, 1958) is a Canadian politician who represented the riding of Battle River-Crowfoot (known as Crowfoot from 2000 to 2015) in the House of Commons of Canada from 2000 to 2019, first as a member of the Canadian Alliance (2000–2003) and then as a member of the Conservative Party of Canada. He served as Minister of State for Finance under Prime Minister Stephen Harper from July 15, 2013 until the end of the Harper Government on November 4, 2015. He also served as the Opposition critic to the Solicitor General, the associate critic for Public Safety and Emergency Preparedness, and the deputy critic for Justice.

Sorenson represented a riding that is very conservative even by the standards of rural Alberta; most of his territory has been held by a centre-right MP without interruption since 1935. He won the riding by some of the largest margins ever recorded in Canadian politics. He was first elected in 2000, taking 70.5 percent of the vote. It would be the only time that he dropped below 80 percent of the vote. In the 2006 federal election, he was re-elected with 82.5 per cent of the popular vote, the highest total recorded by a Conservative candidate in that election.

Sorenson used to chair the Standing Committee on Public Safety and National Security and the Standing Committee on Public Accounts.

References

External links

Kevin Sorenson official website

1958 births
Living people
Members of the House of Commons of Canada from Alberta
Canadian Alliance MPs
Conservative Party of Canada MPs
Farmers from Alberta
Members of the 28th Canadian Ministry
Members of the King's Privy Council for Canada